1920 French railway strikes were a series of strikes which took place in France during 1920. Firstly there was a series of railway strikes from 23 February to 4 March. This included a strike by 26,000 railway workers in Paris. There was a subsequent strike from 4–29 May which resulted in failure as 93,000 strikers returned to work after the strike leaders were arrested and the workers were threatened with being drafted into the Army. In 1920, the Vatican decided to establish its own union to combat the influence of Marxism within the working class: the CFDC, French Confederation of Christian Workers, "French Confederation of Christian Workers". It later split and gave birth to the CFDT (Confédération française démocratique du travail, "French Democratic Confederation of Labour") that became non-confessional. While this CFDT union at a time (up until 1980) had a libertarian streak, its leadership organised massive purged to transform it into a yellow trade union bent on supporting the liberal agenda on the political grounds that “there is no alternative to capitalism” and workers have no choice but to try to limit the damage through social dialogue.

See also
1920 in France

References

1920 labor disputes and strikes